Nattilik was a territorial electoral district (riding) for the Legislative Assembly of Nunavut, Canada.

The riding consisted of the communities of  Gjoa Haven and Taloyoak. Gjoa Haven is now a part of the Gjoa Haven riding and Taloyoak is a part of the Netsilik riding.

The seat became vacant as of 22 February due to the resignation of former Member of the Legislative Assembly, Enuk Pauloosie. Clerk of the assembly, John Quirke, said that a by-election must be held within six months. A by-election was held 26 April 2010, with Jeannie Ugyuk winning the seat.

Election results

1999 election

2004 election

2008 election

2010 by-election

References

External links
Website of the Legislative Assembly of Nunavut

Electoral districts of Kitikmeot Region
1999 establishments in Nunavut
2013 disestablishments in Nunavut